Cunningham is an unincorporated community in Adams County, Washington, United States. It was platted in 1901 by preacher and land promoter W. R. Cunningham.

Cunningham is on the Hatton U.S. Geological Survey Map.

References

Unincorporated communities in Adams County, Washington
Unincorporated communities in Washington (state)